The 1864 Melbourne Cup was a two-mile handicap horse race which took place on Thursday, 3 November 1864.

This year was the fourth running of the Melbourne Cup. Lantern carried just 6st 3 lb (39.5 kg) to defeat Poet and Rose of Denmark finished third. The race was run in heavy going and Lantern's time of 3 minutes and 52 second equaled the 1861 Melbourne Cup for the slowest winning time. Lantern then became the first horse to win the Cup and the VRC Derby in the same year though unlike today the Derby was run after the Cup. The Derby was run a day after the Cup and after winning there he returned to win over a mile the next day to win three races in three straight days. Lantern had to be put down after he broke down in the Ballarat Cup days later.

This is the list of placegetters for the 1864 Melbourne Cup.

See also

 Melbourne Cup
 List of Melbourne Cup winners
 Victoria Racing Club

References

External links
1864 Melbourne Cup footyjumpers.com

1864
Melbourne Cup
Melbourne Cup
19th century in Melbourne
1860s in Melbourne